The Iranun language (Jawi: إيراناونساي), also known as Iranon or Illanun, is an Austronesian language belonging to the Danao languages spoken in the provinces of Maguindanao del Norte and other part of Lanao del Sur and Lanao del Norte, coastal municipalities of Zamboanga del Sur from Tukuran to Dumalinao and Cotabato in southern Philippines and the Malaysian state of Sabah. It is the second most spoken language in Maguindanao after the Maguindanao language.

Distribution 
Iranun is spoken in the following areas:
Maguindanao del Norte: Barira, Buldon, Parang, Matanog, Sultan Mastura, and Sultan Kudarat
Cotabato: Alamada, Banisilan, Carmen, Libungan, and Pigcawayan
Lanao del Norte: Kauswagan and Kolambugan
Lanao del Sur: Balabagan, Bumbaran, and Picong
Bukidnon: Kalilangan
Zamboanga del Sur: Pagadian, San Pablo, Dumalinao, Dimataling and Tukuran
Sabah: Kota Belud, Lahad Datu, and Kota Kinabalu.

References

Danao languages
Languages of Maguindanao del Norte
Languages of Lanao del Norte
Languages of Lanao del Sur
Languages of Cotabato
Languages of Sabah
Languages of Malaysia